The 1995–1996 FA Women's Premier League Cup was the 5th staging of the FA Women's Premier League Cup, a knockout competition for England's top 36 women's football clubs.

The tournament was won by Wembley, who beat Doncaster Rovers Belles 5-3 via a penalty shootout.

References

1995–96 in English women's football
FA Women's National League Cup
Doncaster Rovers Belles L.F.C. matches
FA Women's Premier League Cup 1995-96